Dienten am Hochkönig is a municipality in the district of Zell am See (Pinzgau region), in the state of Salzburg in Austria. The population (as of May 2001) is 800.

Dienten is also part of the High King Mountain Ski Area.

Geography 
The municipality is located in the Pinzgau in the Salzburgerland at the foot of the Hochkoenig mountain. (2,943m)

History 
Dienten was first mentioned in 963. Since the Medieval age, there was an iron mine in the region of Dienten which was abandoned in 1864.

Accommodation 
 Hotel Übergossene Alm

Notable people
 Johann Oberreiter (1807–1865): former mayor of Werfen and convicted murderer

References

Cities and towns in Zell am See District